FCD may refer to:

Health and medicine 
 Fibrocystic disease
 Fleck corneal dystrophy
 Focal cortical dysplasia
 Food composition data
 Fuchs' corneal dystrophy

Other uses 
 Family Computer Disk System, an add-on for Nintendo's Family Computer game console
 FC Dallas, an American soccer team
 First Chief Directorate, a KGB intelligence organ
 Floating car data, also known as floating cellular data
 Forum for Democratic Change, a political party in Uganda
 Foundation for Child Development
 Free City of Danzig, a semi-autonomous city-state that existed between 1920 and 1939
 Freedom from Chemical Dependency, a non-profit organization that provides substance abuse prevention education for schools.